Mazamet (Languedocien: Masamet) is a commune in the Tarn department in southern France.

It is the second-largest component of the Castres-Mazamet metropolitan area.

Geography
Mazamet is situated on the northern slope of the Montagne Noire and on the Arnette, a small tributary of the Thoré, which forms the commune's northern border.

Population

Economy

The town made its wealth during the 18th and 19th centuries, when it was the world center of the wool industry. At its height, the town imported more than 100,000 tonnes of wool annually from the Southern Hemisphere. After processing, numerous establishments were involved in wool-spinning and in the manufacture of leather goods, gloves, blankets, hosiery and clothing for the troops. Mazamet was the biggest center of the wool pulling industry in Europe. In 1906, 95% of French workers in the industry were employed in Tarn. While the vast majority of Mazamet's wool industry ended in the early 1990's, the town still has a residual high-end leather industry with leather being purchased by a number of Paris & London fashion houses.

Today, Mazamet is known for tourism, thanks to its natural setting at the foothills of the Montagne Noire mountain range and being close to the UNESCO World Heritage Sites of Albi, Carcassonne and the Canal du Midi.

The town has a  cycle path, plus numerous other cycling + walking routes.

Notable people
 Pierre Capretz, developer of the French in Action series for teaching French, was born in Mazamet in 1925.
 Maurice Euzennat (1926–2004), historian and archaeologist, died in Mazamet
 Laurent Jalabert, Road bicycle racing  professional was born here.
 Nicolas Jalabert, Road bicycle racing  professional was born here.
 Pierre Sancan, pianist and composer, was born in Mazamet in 1916.
 Jean-Michel Vernhes, public servant, was born in Mazamet in 1950.

Tour de France
Mazamet was the start for Stage 14 in the 2007 Tour de France, finishing on the top of Plateau de Beille. The stage was won by Alberto Contador, who later went on to win the Tour. In 2018, Mazamet welcomed the race once again as it passed through on route to Carcassonne.

Twin towns
Mazamet is twinned with:

Rybnik, Poland

See also
 Castres-Mazamet Airport
 Communes of the Tarn department
 Tourism in Tarn

References

Notes

External links

Official website 
Espace Apollo website of Mazamet Cultural centre
official website of the Greater Castres-Mazamet Council 
personal site

Gallery

Communes of Tarn (department)
Languedoc